Patricia Rhomberg (born 15 September 1953) is an Austrian former pornographic film actress from the 1970s.

Early career
Rhomberg was working as a medical assistant when she met the German director Hans Billian and began a relationship with him.

In 1975, she starred in the first full hardcore German porn movie, Bienenstich im Liebesnest (the soft version was titled Im Gasthaus zum scharfen Hirschen, also known as Zimmermädchen machen es gerne) directed by Billian, where she played Graziella Schill, a woman chasing the elderly husband who cheated. In this film, she did not perform hardcore action: the most explicit sexual act is a brief footjob.

Josefine Mutzenbacher
In 1976, Billian gave her the lead role, in part because she had the proper dialect for it, in the first part of the adult film Josefine Mutzenbacher – Wie sie wirklich war (known in English as Sensational Janine), in which she plays the Vienna prostitute Josefine Mutzenbacher. This film brought her to fame in Germany. Josefine's age is 14 years old in the novel, but no age is mentioned in the script of the film.

Jim Holliday has described this film as "easily the best and most accurate of several films based on the life and adventures of legendary Viennese madam Josephine Mutzenbacher" and his "all time foreign favorite" adult film. Sensational Janine was "one of the most successful foreign x-rated films ever to cross the Atlantic", and the movie is "today seen as one of the best porns of all time".

Later career
In 1977, she starred in Kasimir der Kuckuckskleber. Her role was Larissa Holm, a "fun loving" young woman who agrees with Kasimir Zwickelhuber (played by Sepp Gneißl) to go into prostitution in order to pay off some debts. Around this period as well, she starred in numerous hardcore loops directed by Billian, such as Venus in Seide and Schwarzer Orgasmus, which were among the first examples of interracial pornography on the German porn scene. In addition to her acting work, she also worked as a fluffer for other Billian films.

In 1978, she broke with Billian and returned to her original profession.

References

External links
 
 
 
 
  Patricia Rhomberg in Encyclo ciné

1953 births
Living people
20th-century Austrian actresses
Actresses from Vienna
Austrian pornographic film actresses